The 8th Cinema Express Awards were held on 3 April 1988, and honoured the best of South Indian films released in 1987.

Tamil

Telugu

Notes

References 

1988 Indian film awards
Cinema Express Awards